Ida Rapaičová (born 22 August 1943 in Bratislava) is a Slovak actress and former politician. She graduated in Acting from the  Academy of Performing Arts in Bratislava in 1967. Since graduation, she has been an actress of the New Scene theatre. In addition to theatre acting, she starred in many popular Slovak movies and hosted a variety of radio shows.  In 1994-1998 she served as a member of the National Council, representing the Movement for a Democratic Slovakia. Following the end of her mandate, she quit politics and returned full-time to acting. 

In 2013, she received Pribina Cross 2nd class from the President of Slovakia Ivan Gašparovič for her contributions to the development of Slovak culture.

Rapaičová has a son and a daughter.

References 

Living people
1943 births
Actors from Bratislava
Members of the National Council (Slovakia) 1994-1998
Female members of the National Council (Slovakia)
Recipients of the Pribina Cross
Slovak film actresses
Slovak stage actresses
Slovak television actresses
Academy of Performing Arts in Bratislava alumni